Frans Sales Lega Airport or Ruteng Airport  is an airport located in Ruteng, Manggarai regency, East Nusa Tenggara, Indonesia. The airport runway measures 1,300 x 30 m. The distance from the city center is about 2 km.

The airport used to be called Satar Tacik Airport. The name change was contained in the Decree of the Minister of Transportation KP No.190 of 2008 dated 4 April 2008. The name was changed to reward services of the late Frans Sales Lega (id) who initiated the establishment of the airport.

Airlines and destinations

External links
  Direktorat Jenderal Perhubungan Udara
  Airport name change news - NTT Provincial Government

Airports in East Nusa Tenggara